, born June 26, 1981, is a female Japanese mixed martial artist. She retired as the DEEP Women's Lightweight (106-Pound) Champion in 2010.

Growing up, Matsumoto studied piano and penmanship and was not interested in sports. She began training in MMA as a part-time job to kill time and save money after studying overseas but went on to become one of the most successful female mixed martial artists in the world.

On February 28, 2010 at DEEP: 46th Impact, Matsumoto confirmed weeks of speculation by announcing that she would be retiring from mixed martial arts. She officially retired following an exhibition match with Megumi Fujii at DEEP: 47th Impact on April 17, 2010.

Mixed martial arts career
Matsumoto debuted in mixed martial arts for the Greatest Common Multiple promotion at Cross Section 2 on September 4, 2004. She defeated Eri Ishiyama by Unanimous Decision.

Matsumoto won nine of her next eleven fights, losing only to Misaki Takimoto on October 24, 2004 and again on December 17, 2005. She was defeated by Carina Damm in a controversial bout at MARS Attack 1 on July 21, 2006, but avenged the loss in a rematch one month later on August 26.

Matsumoto became the number one contender in DEEP after back-to-back wins over Seo Hee Ham and Misaki Takimoto in their third meeting.

She captured the DEEP Women's Lightweight Championship by defeating Hisae Watanabe at DEEP: 31st Impact on August 5, 2007.

On June 28, 2009, Matsumoto avenged the final unavenged loss on her record by defeating Lisa Ellis, who had previously defeated Matsumoto in September 2006 by submitting her with an armlock in the third round. Matsumoto counts the rematch with Ellis as the most influential fight of her career.

Matsumoto defeated veteran Japanese striker "Windy" Tomomi Sunaba at DEEP: 44th Impact on October 10. Both before and after the fight, Matsumoto stated that she would like to challenge Megumi Fujii in the future.

Retirement
On February 28, 2010, Matsumoto announced her retirement from mixed martial arts in front of a shocked audience at DEEP: 46th Impact in Tokyo, Japan.

In a blog entry on March 2, 2010, Matsumoto stated that she had become detached from MMA and no longer had the ability to continue serious training or perform as a professional fighter. She further stated that she had no regrets about her decision to retire and does not plan to remain involved with MMA training or coaching in the near future.

Matsumoto engaged in a five-minute exhibition match with friend and fellow fighter Megumi Fujii at DEEP: 47th Impact on April 17, 2010. A retirement ceremony was held for Matsumoto following the match.

At the time of her retirement, Matsumoto was the #3-ranked pound-for-pound female MMA fighter in the world by MMARising.com and the #2-ranked female flyweight according to the Unified Women's MMA Rankings.

Mixed martial arts record

|-
|  Win
| align=center| 23-4
| Tomomi Sunaba
| Decision (unanimous)
| Deep: 44 Impact
| 
| align=center| 2
| align=center| 5:00
| Tokyo, Japan
| 
|-
|  Win
| align=center| 22-4
| Lisa Ellis
| Submission (armbar)
| Deep: Toyama Impact
| 
| align=center| 3
| align=center| 2:53
| Toyama, Japan
| Defended Deep Women's Lightweight Title
|-
|  Win
| align=center| 21-4
| Nicdali Rivera-Calanoc
| TKO (knees to the body)
| Deep: 41 Impact
| 
| align=center| 1
| align=center| 0:21
| Tokyo, Japan
| 
|-
|  Win
| align=center| 20-4
| Hikaru Shinohara
| Submission (armbar)
| Deep: Protect Impact 2008
| 
| align=center| 1
| align=center| 1:00
| Tokyo, Japan
| 
|-
|  Win
| align=center| 19-4
| Misaki Takimoto
| TKO (kicks to the body)
| Deep: 37 Impact
| 
| align=center| 2
| align=center| 4:40
| Tokyo, Japan
| Defended Deep Women's Lightweight Title
|-
|  Win
| align=center| 18-4
| Waenthong Sakrungreong
| Technical Submission (armbar)
| Deep: Protect Impact 2007
| 
| align=center| 1
| align=center| 0:43
| Osaka, Japan
| 
|-
|  Win
| align=center| 17-4
| Yukiko Seki
| Submission (kimura)
| Deep: clubDeep Kanazawa
| 
| align=center| 1
| align=center| 1:07
| Ishikawa, Japan
| 
|-
|  Win
| align=center| 16-4
| Masako Yoshida
| Submission (armbar)
| Deep: clubDeep Sendai
| 
| align=center| 1
| align=center| 3:23
| Miyagi, Japan
| 
|-
|  Win
| align=center| 15-4
| Hisae Watanabe
| Decision (majority)
| Deep: 31 Impact
| 
| align=center| 3
| align=center| 5:00
| Tokyo, Japan
| Won Deep Women's Lightweight Title
|-
|  Win
| align=center| 14-4
| Misaki Takimoto
| Submission (armbar)
| Deep: Oyaji Deep
| 
| align=center| 1
| align=center| 4:32
| Tokyo, Japan
| 
|-
|  Win
| align=center| 13-4
| Seo Hee Ham
| Submission (triangle choke)
| Deep: clubDeep Toyama: Barbarian Festival 6
| 
| align=center| 2
| align=center| 3:44
| Toyama, Japan
| 
|-
|  Win
| align=center| 12-4
| Seri Saito
| Submission (armbar)
| Deep: clubDeep Toyama: Barbarian Festival 5
| 
| align=center| 1
| align=center| 3:17
| Toyama, Japan
| 
|-
|  Loss
| align=center| 11-4
| Lisa Ellis
| Submission (scarf hold armlock)
| Smackgirl - Women Hold Their Ground
| 
| align=center| 1
| align=center| 3:04
| Tokyo, Japan
| 
|-
|  Win
| align=center| 11-3
| Carina Damm
| Decision (unanimous)
| MARS 4 - New Deal
| 
| align=center| 2
| align=center| 5:00
| Tokyo, Japan
| 
|-
|  Loss
| align=center| 10-3
| Carina Damm
| Technical Submission (armbar)
| MARS - MARS Attack 1
| 
| align=center| 2
| align=center| 1:17
| Tokyo, Japan
| 
|-
|  Win
| align=center| 10-2
| Yayoi Okubo
| Submission (armbar)
| Deep: clubDeep Toyama: Barbarian Festival 4
| 
| align=center| 1
| align=center| 0:53
| Toyama, Japan
| 
|-
|  Win
| align=center| 9-2
| Yuki Furudate
| Submission (rear naked choke)
| Deep: 23 Impact
| 
| align=center| 1
| align=center| 2:52
| Tokyo, Japan
| 
|-
|  Loss
| align=center| 8-2
| Misaki Takimoto
| Submission (armbar)
| G-Shooto: G-Shooto 03
| 
| align=center| 1
| align=center| 3:08
| Tokyo, Japan
| 
|-
|  Win
| align=center| 8-1
| Kazumi Kaneko
| TKO (punches)
| Deep: clubDeep Toyama: Barbarian Festival 3
| 
| align=center| 1
| align=center| 0:18
| Toyama, Japan
| 
|-
|  Win
| align=center| 7-1
| Akiko Inoue
| Decision (unanimous)
| G-Shooto: Plus03
| 
| align=center| 2
| align=center| 5:00
| Tokyo, Japan
| 
|-
|  Win
| align=center| 6-1
| Ikuma Shibata
| Submission (armbar)
| W-FACE
| 
| align=center| 1
| align=center| 0:33
| Tokyo, Japan
| 
|-
|  Win
| align=center| 5-1
| Hikaru Shinohara
| Submission (armbar)
| Deep: clubDeep Toyama: Barbarian Festival 2
| 
| align=center| 1
| align=center| 1:44
| Toyama, Japan
| 
|-
|  Win
| align=center| 4-1
| Izumi Noguchi
| Decision (unanimous)
| G-Shooto: G-Shooto 02
| 
| align=center| 2
| align=center| 5:00
| Tokyo, Japan
| 
|-
|  Win
| align=center| 3-1
| Yoko Hattori
| Submission (armbar)
| HEAT 1
| 
| align=center| 1
| align=center| 2:38
| Aichi, Japan
| 
|-
|  Win
| align=center| 2-1
| Chihiro Takahashi
| Submission (armbar)
| G-Shooto: G-Shooto 01
| 
| align=center| 1
| align=center| 3:48
| Tokyo, Japan
| 
|-
|  Loss
| align=center| 1-1
| Misaki Takimoto
| Submission (armbar)
| Deep: clubDeep Toyama: Barbarian Festival 1
| 
| align=center| 1
| align=center| 4:45
| Toyama, Japan
| 
|-
|  Win
| align=center| 1-0
| Eri Ishiyama
| Decision (unanimous)
| Cage Force - Cross Section 2
| 
| align=center| 2
| align=center| 5:00
| Tokyo, Japan
|

Championships
 DEEP Women's Lightweight Champion

See also
List of female mixed martial artists

References

External links
 

1981 births
Living people
Japanese female mixed martial artists
Mixed martial artists utilizing Brazilian jiu-jitsu
Japanese practitioners of Brazilian jiu-jitsu
Female Brazilian jiu-jitsu practitioners
Deep (mixed martial arts) champions
People from Toyama (city)
People from Toyama Prefecture